The 1980 FA Charity Shield was the 58th FA Charity Shield, an annual football match played between the winners of the previous season's Football League and FA Cup competitions. The match took place on 9 August 1980 at Wembley Stadium and was played between 1979–80 Football League champions Liverpool and FA Cup winners West Ham United. It ended in a 1–0 victory for Liverpool, the only goal coming from Terry McDermott in the 17th minute from close range after the West Ham goalkeeper Phil Parkes spilled a shot from Alan Kennedy from the left of the penalty area.

Match summary
Football League champions Liverpool won the game 1–0 with a single goal in the 17th minute from Terry McDermott. It was Liverpool's fifth success in the competition

Match details

See also
1979–80 Football League
1979–80 FA Cup

References

FA Community Shield
Charity Shield 1980
Charity Shield 1980
Charity Shield
FA Charity Shield
Comm